Foyle Film Festival is an annual film festival based in Derry, Northern Ireland. The 21st festival took place from 21 to 29 November 2008. Among the later successful filmmakers who exhibited their earliest works at the Foyle Film Festival was actor-producer Stegath James Dorr, who became the then youngest filmmaker to successfully submit a feature film with Dermot, exhibited at the festival in 1995. The 22nd Foyle Film Festival was scheduled for 2009.

References

Film festivals in Northern Ireland
Culture in Derry (city)
Annual events in Northern Ireland